London Buses route 44 is a Transport for London contracted bus route in London, England. Running between Tooting and  Victoria, it is operated by London General.

History
Today's route 44 commenced operation on 1 October 1950 in Stage 1 of London Transport's Post-war "Buses for Trams" scheme, running as a daily service between Mitcham (Three Kings Pond) and London Bridge station via Tooting, Wandsworth, Clapham Junction, Vauxhall and Borough Market. It replaced tram route 12 which ran from London Bridge to Battersea and Wandsworth and trolleybus route 612 from Battersea and Mitcham, both of which were withdrawn at the same time.

References

External links

Bus routes in London
Transport in the City of Westminster
Transport in the London Borough of Wandsworth